Asclera is a genus of false blister beetles in the family Oedemeridae. There are about six described species in Asclera.

Species
 Asclera auripilis VanDyke, 1946
 Asclera discolor LeConte, 1874
 Asclera excavata LeConte, 1852
 Asclera nigra LeConte, 1852
 Asclera puncticollis (Say, 1823)
 Asclera ruficollis (Say, 1823) (red-necked false blister beetle)

References

 Arnett, Ross H. Jr. (1983). "Family 119. Oedemeridae, The False Blister Beetles". Checklist of the Beetles of North and Central America and the West Indies, 6.
 Kriska, Nadine L. / Arnett, Ross H. Jr., Michael C. Thomas, Paul E. Skelley, and J. H. Frank, eds. (2002). "Family 109. Oedemeridae Latreille 1810". American Beetles, vol. 2: Polyphaga: Scarabaeoidea through Curculionoidea, 514–519.

Further reading

 NCBI Taxonomy Browser, Asclera
 Arnett, R. H. Jr., M. C. Thomas, P. E. Skelley and J. H. Frank. (eds.). (21 June 2002). American Beetles, Volume II: Polyphaga: Scarabaeoidea through Curculionoidea. CRC Press LLC, Boca Raton, Florida .
 Arnett, Ross H. (2000). American Insects: A Handbook of the Insects of America North of Mexico. CRC Press.
 Richard E. White. (1983). Peterson Field Guides: Beetles. Houghton Mifflin Company.

Oedemeridae